The Raging Bull is a revolver manufactured by the Brazilian Taurus International firearm company.

In its larger calibers it is marketed as a hunter's sidearm because it is a potent weapon with plenty of stopping power. The .454 Casull cartridge has been used to hunt animals as large as Cape Buffalo.

The Raging Bull has a ported barrel and a red rubber strip along the back of its grip (in some variants such as the Raging Hornet, this strip is yellow), which cushions the shooter's hand and lowers perceived recoil.  Functionally, the Raging Bull has a manually operated front cylinder latch, whose release can be seen on the crane.  Front cylinder latches are required for such high-powered double-action revolvers, and are found on the Ruger Super Redhawk and the S&W Model 500 revolver, but they are actuated by the rear cylinder latch.  The manually operated latch on the Raging Bull is simpler (and thus less expensive to produce) yet equally strong, but requires two hands to open the cylinder.

Variants
The Raging Bull comes in several models, classified by caliber. Additionally, each model has its own barrel length and metal finish options.

Current

Model 444: .44 Magnum caliber, can also fire the shorter .44 Special.
Model 444 Ultralite: Compact .44 with a 4-inch barrel. Blued and titanium finishes only.
Model 454: .454 Casull caliber, can also fire the shorter .45 Colt.
Model 513 (Raging Judge Magnum): .454 Casull, .45 Colt, .410 shot shell  —  six round cylinder

Discontinued
Model 218 (Raging Bee): .218 Bee caliber, 10" barrel. Stainless steel only.
Model 22H (Raging Hornet): .22 Hornet caliber, 10" barrel. Stainless steel only.
Model 30C (Raging Thirty): .30 Carbine caliber, 10" barrel. Stainless steel only.
Model 416: .41 Magnum caliber.
Model 45: .45 Colt caliber only and featured a six-round cylinder
Model 480: .480 Ruger caliber.
Model 500: .500 S&W Magnum caliber, can also fire the shorter .500 S&W Special.
Model 513 Ultralite (Raging Judge): .45 Colt, .410 shot shell - featured a light weight frame, 3 inch barrel and 7 round cylinder.
Model 528 (Raging Judge XXVIII) (Never released): 28 gauge shot shell

Optional finishes include stainless steel, matte stainless steel, nickel-plated and blued. Barrel options include 2", 4", 6", 8", 10". Not all finishes or barrels are available for every model. All models have ported barrels, except for the 22H, 30C, 513, 528 and Ultralite. All models have fixed front sights and adjustable rear sights.

The Raging Hornet, the Raging Bee and the Raging Thirty have yellow rubber insert strips, as opposed to the typical red strip.

Most Raging Bull variants can mount commercial optical sights and lasers with the aid of an optional screw-on Picatinny rail.

Raging Hunter 
The Raging Hunter is a series of revolvers developed by Taurus in 2019, chambered for .357 Magnum, .38 Special +P and .44 Magnum. A .454 Casull variant was created in 2020, and another for .460 S&W Magnum in 2021. In the 2019 NRA Golden Bullseye Awards, the Raging Hunter won "handgun of the year." The Raging Hunter weighs .

References

External links
Taurus USA - list of all Raging Bull variants

Taurus revolvers
.45 Colt firearms
.50 caliber handguns
.454 Casull firearms
Single-action revolvers